Quoditch is a hamlet in the parish of Ashwater, part of the Torridge district of Devon, England.

Hamlets in Devon
Torridge District